Rod 'n' Emu is an English animated series shown on CITV in 1991.

It starred the voices of Rod Hull who created and wrote all the episodes starring as himself, with Carol Lee Scott as Grotbags and Freddie Stevens as her assistants Croc the crocodile and Redford the robot.

This was the last series to feature Hull, Emu and Scott before the latter starred in her own TV series Grotbags. The show was made by FilmFair for Central Independent Television and thirteen episodes were aired.

Premise
The show followed the fortunes of Rod and his pet Emu whose lives are in danger of Grotbags and her companions.

Cast
Rod Hull as Rod
Carol Lee Scott as Grotbags
Freddie Stevens as Croc/Redford

Crew
Created by: Rod Hull
Written by: Rod Hull and Ian Sachs
Animators: Malcolm Bourne, Geoff Loynes
Backgrounds: Geoff Chennell
Trace and Paint Supervisor: Christine Courtney
Tracers: Angela Bristow, Christine Farrington, Alma Sachs, Marie Turner
Painters: Jo Beheit, Lynne Sachs, Tessa Farrington
Checkers: Debra Thaine, David Schwartz
Camera: Andrew Coates, Isabelle Perrichon, Craig Simpson, Roy Watford
Studio Assistant: David Birch
Editors: Andi Sloss, Alec Jeakins, Simon Cox
Music: Keith Hopwood
Directed by: Dick Horn and Ian Sachs
Assistant Producer: Peter Lewis
Executive Producer: David Yates
A FilmFair Production for Central Independent Television
© FilmFair/Rod Hull 1991
© Hibou Productions Ltd/FilmFair Ltd 1991
A Central Presentation

Transmission guide
Series 1a: 2 editions from 8 January 1991 – 15 January 1991
Series 1b: 11 editions from 24 May 1991 – 2 August 1991

External links

1991 British television series debuts
1991 British television series endings
1990s British children's television series
British children's animated adventure television series
British children's animated fantasy television series
ITV children's television shows
English-language television shows
Television series by FilmFair
Television series by DHX Media
Television series by ITV Studios
Television shows produced by Central Independent Television
1990s British animated television series